Castle in the Air is a 1952 British comedy film directed by Henry Cass and starring David Tomlinson, Helen Cherry and Margaret Rutherford. It was based on the stage play of the same title by Alan Melville. Produced by ABPC, shooting took place at the company's Elstree Studios.

Plot 
The penniless 19th Earl of Locharne (David Tomlinson), the owner of a run-down Scottish castle which he has made into a mostly empty hotel, has to deal with a myriad of financial troubles, starting with his creditors and the few disgruntled tenants. Then there is Mr. Phillips (Brian Oulton), a socialist official from the British National Coal Board, which wants to requisition (not buy) it to convert into a vacation hostel for miners and their families. The earl introduces Phillips to a beautiful family ghost, Ermyntrude (Patricia Dainton), the earl's grandfather's mistress.

Next, a long-time prospective purchaser, wealthy, attractive American divorcee Mrs. Clodfelter Dunne (Barbara Kelly), shows up unannounced to look over the place in person. The earl's evident attraction to Mrs. Dunne is observed with dismay by his assistant, "Boss" Trent (Helen Cherry).

Both Mr. Phillips and Mrs. Dunne stay overnight at the castle. The earl is hard-pressed to simultaneously convince the former that the castle is falling into ruin and the latter that it is well worth purchasing.

Meanwhile, eccentric boarder Miss Nicholson (Margaret Rutherford) is obsessed with proving that the earl is actually the rightful King of Scotland. When Mrs. Dunne expresses her belief that she is a member of the family, a delighted Miss Nicholson sets out to try to trace her lineage.

Mrs. Dunne eventually decides to purchase the place. She and the earl drive to Aberdeen to see his solicitor, Pettigrew. The price is $250,000 (about £70,000). Later, the earl receives a message to see an unnamed lady in hotel room 57. However, when he enters the room, he is disappointed to find Miss Nicholson and her followers, bent on a Jacobite restoration. The ensuing party runs late into the night, with Mrs. Dunne and Pettigrew in attendance. The earl and Mrs. Dunne, both rather intoxicated, return to the castle around four in the morning.

The next day, Trent, believing that the earl and Mrs. Dunne were alone in the hotel room, quarrels with the earl. She makes him inform Mrs. Dunne that the castle is in danger of being requisitioned. Mrs. Dunne takes back her cheque. However, after hearing from Phillips that he has been passed over for promotion, the earl has Mrs. Dunne offer him the position of managing the castle for her for a large salary, provided he turn in a recommendation that the castle not be acquired. He agrees. Now that the sale has been reinstated, the earl asks Trent to marry him, much to her delight. Miss Nicholson interrupts them with dreadful news: it turns out the earl is not in the direct line of succession after all.

Cast 

 David Tomlinson as The Earl of Locharne
 Helen Cherry as Boss Trent
 Margaret Rutherford as Miss Nicholson
 Barbara Kelly as Mrs. J. Clodfelter Dunne
 A. E. Matthews as Blair, a tenant
 Patricia Dainton as Ermyntrude
 Ewan Roberts as Menzies, the earl's loyal servant
 Brian Oulton as Phillips
 Clive Morton as MacFee
 Gordon Jackson as Hiker
 Pat Sandys as Girl Hiker
 Russell Waters as Moffat
 John Harvey as Andrews
 Esme Beringer as Mrs. Thompson, a tenant
 Winifred Willard as Miss Miller, a tenant
 David Hannaford as Small Boy
 Helen Christie as Jessie
 Archie Duncan as Constable
 Norman Macowan as Pettigrew
 Stringer Davis as Hall Porter
 Paul Blake as Hotel Manager

Critical reception
At the time of its American release, The New York Times described the film as a "slender but thoroughly good-natured little British comedy"

In the 21st century, a reviewer on the website Fantastic Movie Musings and Ramblings wrote, "all in all, a delightful comedy." A reviewer for TVGuide.com said, "this stage play should have stayed on the stage."

References

External links 
 
 
 
Review of film at Variety

1952 comedy films
1952 films
British black-and-white films
British comedy films
Films shot at Associated British Studios
British films based on plays
Films directed by Henry Cass
Films set in castles
Films set in Scotland
Films with screenplays by Edward Dryhurst
1950s English-language films
1950s British films